Praline can refer to 

 Praline (nut confection), a caramelised sugar heated to 160C and combined with a roasted nut combination. Commonly made with sugar, corn syrup, milk, butter, and nuts halves. It’s a confection with a history as rich as its flavour.
 Chocolate praline, chocolates with a soft filling. 

The praline's origins may date back as far as the early 17th century. It's believed the praline was created by Chef Clement Lassagne, who worked for French diplomat César duc de Choiseul, Comte du Plessis-Praslin. Chef Lassagne's original praline combined almonds and a caramelized coating.